Live the Storm is the sixth album by Swedish hardcore punk/D-beat band Disfear. It was released in January 2008 under Relapse Records.

Track listing

Personnel
Disfear
Tomas Lindberg - vocals
Björn Peterson - guitars
Uffe Cederlund - guitars
Henke Frykman - bass
Marcus Andersson - drums

Production
Kurt Ballou - recording, mixing, engineering
Henrik Jonsson - mastering
Orion Landau - cover art

References

External links
Live the Storm by Disfear at iTunes.com

Disfear albums
2008 albums
Albums produced by Kurt Ballou
Relapse Records albums